The Alor Setar railway station is a Malaysian railway station located at and named after the state capital city of Alor Setar, Kedah. The station is served by both the KTM ETS and KTM Komuter Northern Sector services.

The old, single-platform station, with its distinctive clock tower, was closed 29 January 2013 to facilitate the construction of a new modern station under the Ipoh–Padang Besar electrification and double-tracking project. A temporary station opposite the old station was constructed along Jalan Tanjung Bendahara, which remained in operation until the new station adjacent to the old one began operations on 12 June 2014. The old station has been conserved and transformed into the Railway Tavern restaurant and bar. In 2020, a century-old Hindu shrine, Sri Madurai Veeran, situated at the entrance of the station, was demolished to make way for a road project despite local objections. It was built by Indian labourers who laid tracks from Butterworth to the northern frontier in the early 20th century. It was featured in the Malaysian film Ombak Rindu, in 2011.

Around the station
 Kedah State Art Gallery
 Sultan Abdul Halim Mu'adzam Shah Gallery

References

External links

Kuala Lumpur MRT & KTM Intercity Integrations

Alor Setar
KTM ETS railway stations
Railway stations opened in 1915
1915 establishments in British Malaya
Railway stations in Kedah